William Linley (1771–1835) was one of seven musical siblings born to Thomas Linley the elder and his wife Mary Johnson.

Early life
Born in Bath, Somerset, on 27 January 1771 Linley was the youngest child of Thomas Linley and Mary Johnson (1729–1820). Educated at Harrow and then St Paul's
School, additional tutoring in musical disciplines was provided by his father and Carl Friedrich Abel.

He joined the British East India Company and was in India 1790-1795 and 1800–1805, holding a writership at their College in Madras.  He retired from the company in 1810 and devoted himself to singing, composing glees and songs and writing literature. He bequeathed his collection of family portraits to Dulwich Picture Gallery.

The Linley portrait collection: seven musical siblings

References

External links

English classical composers
Glee composers
People educated at Harrow School
British East India Company people
1771 births
1835 deaths
William
English male classical composers
Dulwich Picture Gallery